The Call is a historical novel by Australian writer Martin Flanagan. It was first published by Allen & Unwin in 1998. It is a semi-fictional account of the life of cricketer and Australian rules football founder Tom Wills.

It was adapted into a stage play for Malthouse Theatre in 2004.

Plot summary

See also
Australian rules football in popular culture

References

External links
 The Call at One Day Hill
 The Call at Allen & Unwin

1998 Australian novels
Fiction set in the 19th century
Novels set in Victoria (Australia)
Novels set in Queensland
Novels about cricket
Australian novels adapted into plays